This is a list of clubs that play Australian rules football in Victoria at the senior level.
Guide to abbreviations: 
FC = Football Club
AFC = Australian Football Club (mainly used if in Queensland or NSW or outside Australia) / Amateur Football Club (mainly used in the other Australian States)
ARFC = Australian Rules Football Club

National Level

Australian Football League

State Level

Victorian Football League

Suburban leagues

Eastern Football League

Essendon District Football League

Northern Football League

Southern Football League (Victoria)

Victorian Amateur Football Association
A Section
Beaumaris Football Club
Collegians Football Club
De La Salle Old Collegians
Old Melburnians
Old Trinity Grammarians
Old Xaverians
St Bedes/Mentone Tigers Football Club
St Kevins Old Boys
University Blacks
University Blues

B Section

AJAX Football Club
Fitzroy Football Club
Hampton Rovers Football Club
Old Brighton Grammarians
Old Carey Grammarians
Mazenod Old Collegians
Monash Blues Football Club
Parkdale Vultures
Peninsula Old Boys
St Bernards Old Collegians

C Section

Caulfield Grammarians Football Club
Hampton Rovers Football Club
Kew Football Club
Marcellin Old Collegians
Old Camberwell Grammarians
Old Geelong
Old Haileyburians
Old Ivanhoe Football Club
Old Mentonians
Williamstown CYMS

Division 1 

Ivanhoe Assumption Football Club
Oakleigh Amateur Football Club
Ormond Amateur Football Club
North Old Boys
PEGS Football Club
Preston Bullants
St Johns Old Collegians
St Mary's Amateur Football Club
Therry Penola Old Boys
Whitefriars Old Collegians

Division 2 
Bulleen-Templestowe Football Club
Eltham Old Collegians
Emmaus St Leo's Old Collegians Football Club
Glen Eira Amateur Football Club
Hawthorn Amateur Football Club
Melbourne High School Old Boys
Old Paradians
Prahran Football Club
West Brunswick Football Club
Yarra Valley Old Boys

Division 3 

Albert Park Football Club
Canterbury Football Club
La Trobe University Football Club
Old Westbourne
Point Cook Football Club
Powerhouse Football Club
Richmond Central Football Club
South Melbourne Districts Football Club
Swinburne Football Club
University High School-Victoria University Football Club

Division 4 

Aquinas Old Collegians
Eley Park Football Club
Elsternwick Football club
Manningham Amateur Football Club
Masala Football Club
Mount Lilydale Football Club
North Brunswick Football Club
Parkside Football Club
St Francis Xavier Football Club

Club XVIII   A

Brunswick NOB SPC
Chadstone Football Club
Hawthorn Amateur Football Club
Melbourne High School Old Boys
Old Xaverians Football Club
Prahran Assumption Football Club
Richmond Central Football Club
South Mornington Football Club

Club XVIII   B
Box Hill North Football Club
Chadstone Football Club
Monash Blues Football Club
Monash Gryphons
Swinburne University AFC
West Brunswick Football Club
Westbourne Grammarians Football Club
University High School-Victoria University Football Club

Western Region Football League

Country leagues

Alberton

Ballarat

Bellarine

Bendigo

Central Highlands

Central Murray

Colac & District

East Gippsland

Ellinbank & District

Geelong & District

Geelong

Gippsland

Golden Rivers

Goulburn Valley

Hampden

Heathcote

Horsham & District

Kyabram & District

Loddon Valley

Maryborough Castlemaine

Mid Gippsland

Millewa

Mininera

Mornington Peninsula Nepean

Murray

North Central

North Gippsland

Omeo & District

Outer East Football Netball League

Ovens & King

Ovens & Murray

Picola & District

Riddell District

South East

South West District

Sunraysia

Tallangatta

Upper Murray

Warrnambool

West Gippsland

Wimmera

Other Links

 
Australia clubs
Football